The 1997 National Camogie League is a competition in the women's team field sport of camogie was won by Cork, who defeated Kilkenny in the final, played at Páirc Uí Rinn.

Arrangements
Kilkenny overpowered Kilkenny 4–17 to 3–10 in the semi-final but had t play the final without Sinéad Millea who had gone to the USA. Cork defeated Galway 0–17 to 1–10 in the semi-final.

The Final
Cork took command of the final almost immediately and ran out 15-point winners.

Division 2
The Junior National League, known since 2006 as Division Two, was won by Antrim who defeated Down in an all-Ulster final.

Final stages

References

External links
 Camogie Association

National Camogie League
1997